The 2016–17 Magyar Kupa, known as  for sponsorship reasons, was the 59th edition of the tournament.

Schedule
The rounds of the 2016–17 competition are scheduled as follows:

Matches 
A total of 46 matches will take place, starting with Round I on 14 September 2016 and culminating with the Final on 2 April 2017 at the Messzi István Sports Hall in Kecskemét.

Round I
The first round ties are scheduled for 14 – 21 September 2016.

|-
!colspan="3" style="background:#ccccff;"| 14 September

|-
!colspan="3" style="background:#ccccff;"| 15 September

|-
!colspan="3" style="background:#ccccff;"| 21 September

|}

Round II
The second round ties are scheduled for 11 – 19 October 2016.

|-
!colspan="3" style="background:#ccccff;"| 11 October

|-
!colspan="3" style="background:#ccccff;"| 19 October

|}

Round III
The third round ties are scheduled for 1 – 13 November 2016.

|-
!colspan="3" style="background:#ccccff;"| 1 November

|-
!colspan="3" style="background:#ccccff;"| 2 November

|-
!colspan="3" style="background:#ccccff;"| 13 November

|}

Round IV
The fourth round ties are scheduled for 4 January 2017.

|-
!colspan="3" style="background:#ccccff;"| 4 January

|}

Quarter-finals
The quarterfinals ties are scheduled for 15 February 2017.

|-
!colspan="3" style="background:#ccccff;"| 15 February

|}

Final four
The final four will be held on 1–2 April 2017 at the Messzi István Sports Hall in Kecskemét.

{{Round4-with third
|RD1 = Semi-finals
|RD2 = Final
|Consol= Bronze medal match
| team-width=205
| score-width=40

|1 April, 14:10|Győri Audi ETO KC|34|DVSC-TvP|14
|1 April, 16:10|FTC-Rail Cargo Hungaria|33|Dunaújvárosi Kohász KA|29

|2 April, 16:00|Győri Audi ETO KC|29 |FTC-Rail Cargo Hungaria (pen.)|29 

|2 April, 13:45|DVSC-TvP|30|Dunaújvárosi Kohász KA|24
}}

AwardsMost valuable player:  Zita Szucsánszki (FTC-Rail Cargo Hungaria)Best Goalkeeper:'''  Blanka Bíró (FTC-Rail Cargo Hungaria)

Semi-finals

Bronze medal match

Final

Final standings

See also
 2016–17 Nemzeti Bajnokság I
 2016–17 Nemzeti Bajnokság I/B
 2016–17 Nemzeti Bajnokság II

References

External links
 Hungarian Handball Federaration
 handball.hu

Magyar Kupa Women